Roberto "Rober" Antonio Correa Silva (born 20 September 1992) is a Spanish professional footballer who plays for SD Eibar as a right-back.

Club career
Born in Badajoz, Extremadura, Correa joined Rayo Vallecano's youth academy in 2010, aged 18. He made his senior debut with the reserves in the 2011–12 season, in the Segunda División B.

On 21 April 2012, Correa made his first-team – and La Liga – debut, in a 2–1 away loss against Sporting de Gijón. He also started the 0–7 home defeat to FC Barcelona, scoring an own goal.

Correa left the Madrid outskirts side on 11 July 2013 and signed a three-year contract with another reserve team, RCD Espanyol B. On 12 June 2015, he renewed his link until 2018 and was definitely promoted to the main squad. On 1 November, he was sent off after two yellow cards in ten minutes of the home fixture with Granada CF, but his team still managed to draw 1–1 thanks to a last-minute goal by Felipe Caicedo.

On 20 July 2016, Correa was loaned to Segunda División club Elche CF for one year. He scored his first goal as a professional on 27 January 2017, when he featured as a first-half substitute and netted two minutes from the end of a 1–0 home win over Girona FC. On 7 August that year, after suffering relegation, he signed a two-year deal with Cádiz CF in the same league. 

Correa agreed to a three-year contract at top-flight SD Eibar on 5 July 2019, as a free agent. He played 12 matches in his first season, in a 14th-place finish.

References

External links

1992 births
Living people
Sportspeople from Badajoz
Spanish footballers
Footballers from Extremadura
Association football defenders
La Liga players
Segunda División players
Segunda División B players
Rayo Vallecano B players
Rayo Vallecano players
RCD Espanyol B footballers
RCD Espanyol footballers
Elche CF players
Cádiz CF players
SD Eibar footballers